1967 in the Philippines details events of note that happened in the Philippines in 1967.

Incumbents

 President: Ferdinand Marcos (Nacionalista Party)
 Vice President: Fernando Lopez (Nacionalista Party)
House Speaker: José Laurel, Jr.
 Chief Justice: Roberto Concepcion
 Congress: 6th

Events

January
 January 6 – Two pilgrimage buses fall into a ravine in Indang, Cavite, killing more than 84 passengers.

May
 May 8 – The province of Davao is dissolved after splitting into three provinces. The provinces of Davao del Norte, Davao del Sur, and Davao Oriental are established.

June
 June 17 – The provinces of Agusan del Norte and Agusan del Sur are created through the enacted Republic Act No. 4979. The province of Agusan is dissolved after the division.

July
 July 2 – Canlaon becomes a city in the province of Negros Occidental through Republic Act 3445 and by virtue of Proclamation No. 193.

August
 August 8 – Association of Southeast Asian Nation (ASEAN) is formed.

November
 November 14 – An election is held for 8 seats in the Senate.

Holidays

As per Act No. 2711 section 29, issued on March 10, 1917, any legal holiday of fixed date falls on Sunday, the next succeeding day shall be observed as legal holiday. Sundays are also considered legal religious holidays. Bonifacio Day was added through Philippine Legislature Act No. 2946. It was signed by then-Governor General Francis Burton Harrison in 1921. On October 28, 1931, the Act No. 3827 was approved declaring the last Sunday of August as National Heroes Day. As per Republic Act No. 3022, April 9 is proclaimed as Bataan Day. Independence Day was changed from July 4 (Philippine Republic Day) to June 12 (Philippine Independence Day) on August 4, 1964.

 January 1 – New Year's Day
 February 22 – Legal Holiday
 March 23 – Maundy Thursday
 March 24 – Good Friday
 April 9 – Araw ng Kagitingan (Day of Valor)
 May 1 – Labor Day
 June 12 – Independence Day 
 July 4 – Philippine Republic Day
 August 13  – Legal Holiday
 August 27  – National Heroes Day
 November 23 – Thanksgiving Day
 November 30 – Bonifacio Day
 December 25 – Christmas Day
 December 30 – Rizal Day

Births

 January 2 – Rose Fostanes, Caregiver, and Singer
 January 6 – Kim Atienza, TV host, actor, voice actor and weather anchor
 January 14 – Elma Muros, athlete
 January 20 – Eric Quizon, actor, director, producer and writer
 January 25 – Nelson Asaytono, basketball player
 February 7 – Fernando Suarez, Catholic priest (d. 2020)
 February 10 – Armand Serrano, animator
 February 28 – Roman Romulo, politician
 March 5 – Joel Virador, human rights activist
 March 10 – Pia Hontiveros, media personality
 March 27 – Liezl Martinez, actress (d. 2015)
 April 23 – Geraldine Roman, journalist and politician
 April 30 – Christine Jacob, swimmer, actress, T.V. host, and newscaster.
 May 14 – Carlos Isagani Zarate, politician, lawyer, and activist
 May 18 – Richard Yap, Chinese-Filipino actor and businessman
 May 19 – Pablo John Garcia, politician
 June 6 - Jordan Lim, Real Estate Broker
 June 26 – Luisito Espinosa, boxer
 July 19 – Vincent Garcia, Politician
 July 24 – Eugene Torres, Businessman
 July 30:
 Andrew E, actor, rapper, and comedian
 Roel Cortez, singer-songwriter (d. 2015)
 August 18 – Mark Meily, Film Director, and TV Commercial Director
 August 22 – Zaldy Ampatuan, Politician
 August 27 – Ogie Alcasid, singer-songwriter, comedian, parodist, and actor
 September 2 – Ricky Carandang, News Anchor
 September 4 – BB Gandanghari, transgender actress, model, entertainer, comedienne, and director
 September 5 – Arnel Pineda, Filipino singer-songwriter
 September 15 – Raymond Bagatsing, actor and model
 September 16 – Yayo Aguila, Actress
 October 11 – Daniel Razon, television, radio host, and singer
 October 24 – Juanito Victor Remulla, politician
 November 6 – Bong Hawkins basketball player
 November 2 – Jenny Syquia, model, actress, and fashion designer
 November 21 – Toby Tiangco, legislator, businessman and politician
 November 30 – Bonel Balingit, Basketball player and actor
 December 31 – Vic Villacorta, animator, Illustrator

Deaths
 February 20 – James Leonard Gordon, Filipino politician. (born 1917)
 April 12 – Emilio S. Liwanag, officer in the Philippine Navy. (born 1911)
 November 19 – Arsenio Laurel, Race Car driver (born 1931)

References